List of films and television shows shot in Pittsburgh may refer to:
List of television shows shot in Pittsburgh
List of films shot in Pittsburgh